Naše Věc was a Czech hip hop band, active from 1997 to 2006.

Beginnings 
Naše Věc started making Hip Hop music in Brno, Czech Republic, in 1997. Their originating members, Dup X, Scissal, Plgál, and Číňan, were doing freestyles and demos. In 1998, only Dup X and Scissal stayed aboard, working on a new demo with Kaluža, a young female MC. After her retirement in 1999, there were new members who made this group famous. Psicho, 2Jay, Apoka, Drone and in 2000, DJ Opia completed the group and started working on their first album, Blázni jsou ti... (Zee Prime 2001). Their second album, Hořký menu (XProduction 2003), which included guests DJ Nneser, Tafrob, Kolpa, Janek and El Mariz, became very popular. They starred at Hip Hop Kemp for three times. Their shows were full of motion, five mc's mostly at the same time on the stage, guesting DJs, MC's and groups mainly from Brno turned their concerts unforgettably wild.

Today 
Naše Věc split up in 2006, however, the majority of its members are still active. Apoka released his solo album Kodex Orthodox (2005). Scissal raps with Kolpa as 4021 on album Grand Trix (4021 2009), with their DJs, 1210 Symphony. 1210 Symphony are DJ Nneser and DJ Diskotek, 2008 World IDA Finalists. Dup X is active in XProduction and together with Apoka and Drone guested on Tafrob's album Sup (Blind Deaf 2010).

Demos 
Demo (1997)
Demoapůl (1998)
Trust No One (Možnosti 1998)

Albums 
Blázni jsou ti... (Zee Prime 2001)
Hořký Menu (XProduction 2003)

External links 
Review of the second album Hořký Menu (musicserver.cz) 
Hořký Menu - review (freemusic.cz) 
Hořký Menu - review (muzikus.cz) 

Czech hip hop groups
1997 establishments in the Czech Republic
2006 disestablishments in the Czech Republic
Musical groups established in 1997
Musical groups disestablished in 2006